Neil Marks  (born 13 September 1938) is an Australian cricketer. He played ten first-class matches for New South Wales between 1958/59 and 1959/60.

In the 2019 Australia Day Honours Marks was awarded the Medal of the Order of Australia (OAM) for service to cricket.

See also
 List of New South Wales representative cricketers

References

External links
 

1938 births
Living people
Australian cricketers
New South Wales cricketers
Cricketers from Sydney
Recipients of the Medal of the Order of Australia